Instincts is the third and final studio album by American new wave band Romeo Void. It was released in 1984 on Columbia Records. The single "A Girl in Trouble (Is a Temporary Thing)" reached #35 on the Billboard Hot 100 singles chart.

Track listing
"Out on My Own" (Debora Iyall, Peter Woods, Frank Zincavage, David Kahne) – 3:51
"Just Too Easy" (Iyall, Woods, Zincavage, Kahne) – 3:09
"Billy's Birthday" (Iyall, Woods, Zincavage) – 4:10
"Going to Neon" (Kahne) – 3:33
"Six Days and One" (Woods, Zincavage) – 4:31
"A Girl in Trouble (Is a Temporary Thing)" (Iyall, Woods, Zincavage, Kahne) – 4:17
"Say No" (Iyall, Woods, Zincavage, Kahne) – 4:37
"Your Life Is a Lie" (Iyall, Woods, Zincavage) – 5:16
"Instincts" (Iyall, Woods, Zincavage) – 4:50

Bonus track (2003 reissue)
"In the Dark" (Benjamin Bossi, Larry Carter, Iyall, Zincavage, Woods) – 4:33 Produced by Ian Taylor  and Ric Ocasek

Personnel
Debora Iyall – vocals
Peter Woods – guitar
Benjamin Bossi – saxophone
Frank Zincavage – bass
Aaron Smith – drums, percussion
Additional personnel
Larry Carter – drums on bonus track
Randy Jackson – bass
Vicki Randle – backing vocals
Tish Lorenzo – narration
Technical
François Kevorkian, Jay Mark, Joe Chiccarelli, Ken Kessie - engineers
Chester Simpson - cover photography

Charts
Album

Single

References

Romeo Void albums
1984 albums
Albums produced by David Kahne
Columbia Records albums